Psychic Cat is the second solo album by Kelli Ali, released in 2004 on One Little Indian Records.

The album was a departure from Ali's previous album, Tigermouth, as she experimented with electronic dance beats and repetitive lyrics, creating more an industrial/electronica sounding album. The first single from this album was a double A-side, "Speakers"/"Voyeur," and the official radio single from this album was "Hot Lips".

Track listing
 Hot Lips
 Psychic Cat
 Speakers
 Home Honey I'm High
 Ideal
 In Praise of Shadows
 Graffiti Boy
 Groupie
 Voyeur
 Last Boy On Earth

Psychic Cat-era B-Sides
"No Money" – 4:33

2004 albums
Kelli Ali albums
Asian Underground albums
Electroclash albums